The public transport in Sofia consists of a comprehensive network of bus, trolleybus, tram and metro lines. It is overseen by the Sofia Urban Mobility Center, a municipal enterprise responsible for route planning, scheduling, fare collection and ticket inspection. It also pays the various transport operators for their service on a per-kilometer basis. Sofia is the only city in Bulgaria that operates the four modes of public transport.

As of 2023, public transport in Sofia is operated by 3 municipal and 1 private company:
 Столичен автотранспорт ЕАД (Sofia Public Bus Transport Company JSC) operates the majority of bus services 
 Столичен електротранспорт ЕАД (Sofia Public Electrical Transport Company JSC) operates the tram and trolleybus networks
 Метрополитен ЕАД (Metropoliten JSC) operates the Sofia Metro
 Private company MTK Group operate some, mainly suburban, bus services

Metro

Tram

Rail

Trolleybus

Bus

Intercity Bus Lines

See also

Sofia Metro
Transport in Bulgaria
List of metro systems
List of tram and light rail transit systems

References

External links
Sofia Urban Mobility Centre official website (in English)

Transport in Sofia